Get Up is the thirteenth album by guitarist/vocalist Richie Kotzen.

Track listing

In Korean version "Blame on Me" is listed as bonus track 11.
In digipak version "Feel Good" is listed as bonus track 11.

Personnel
Richie Kotzen – all instruments
Stevie Salas – bass (on "Shapes of Things")
Brian Tichy – drums (on "Shapes of Things")
Alex Todorov, Richie Kotzen – recorder, mixing

References
 http://www.allmusic.com/album/get-up-mw0000469124

Richie Kotzen albums
1998 albums